The following is a list of the Greater Western Sydney Giants senior coaches in each of their seasons in the Australian Football League.

Key

Coaches

AFL 
 Statistics are correct to the end of the 2021 season

 AFL Women's 
 Statistics are correct to the end of the 2018 season

References 

Coaches
Sydney-sport-related lists
Lists of Australian Football League coaches by club